Kwak is a Korean surname.

Overview
The family name Kwak is written with a hanja meaning "city walls" (also called ). The same character is also used to write the family names Guō in Mandarin Chinese, Kwok in Cantonese, Kaku in Japanese, and Quach in Vietnamese. The 2000 South Korean census found a total of 187,322 people and 58,396 households with this family name. They identified with a number of different bon-gwan (seat of a clan lineage, for example the residence of an ancestor from whom the clan claims descent):

 (Dalseong County): 140,283 people and 43,626 households. They claim descent from Gwak Gyeong, who came to the Korean peninsula from Song dynasty China during the reign of Injong of Goryeo (r. 1122–1146). See Hyeonpung Gwak clan.
Cheongju: 18,218 people and 5,601 households. They claim descent from Gwak Sang, who served in the civil post of  under Heongang of Silla (r. 875–886).
Seonsan: 5,603 people and 1,743 households
Gyeongju: 5,086 people and 1,641 households
22 bon-gwan each with fewer than 3,000 people: 17,942 people and 5,772 households
Other or unknown: 190 people and 13 households

In a study by the National Institute of the Korean Language based on 2007 application data for South Korean passports, it was found that 75.4% of people with this family name spelled it in Latin letters as Kwak in their passports, while 14.4% spelled it in Revised Romanization as Gwak, and 5% spelled it Kwag. Rarer alternative spellings (the remaining 5.2%) included Kwack, Gak, Guak, Kwack, Gwag, Kag, Kawk, Koag, Koak, Kweak, and Kwug.
Other spellings include Kwalk, Kowalk.
Notably, Kwak sounds similar and is spelled similar to Kwok (郭)in Cantonese.

Notable people

Athletes
 Gwak Hyeon-chae (born 1947), South Korean basketball player
 Riki Choshu (born Kwak Gwang-ung, 1951), Japanese professional wrestler of Korean descent
 Gwak Kyung-keun (born 1972), South Korean football forward
 Kwak Ok-chol (born 1973), North Korean judo athlete
 Gwak Mi-hee (born 1974), South Korean cross-country mountain biker and ski mountaineer
 Kwak Hee-ju (born 1981), South Korean football defender
 Kwak Tae-hwi (born 1981), South Korean football centre-back
 Kwak Dong-hyuk (born 1983), South Korean volleyball player
 Kwak Hyok-ju (born 1984), North Korean boxer
 Kwak Jung-hye (born 1986), South Korean sport shooter
 Kwak Chul-ho (born 1986), South Korean football forward
 Kwak Kwang-seon (born 1986), South Korean football defender
 Kwak Chang-hee (born 1987), South Korean football striker
 Kwak Seung-suk (born 1988), South Korean volleyball player
 Kwak Yoon-gy (born 1989), South Korean short track speed skater 
 Kwak Hae-seong (born 1991), South Korean football full-back
 Gwak Dong-han (born 1992), South Korean judo athlete
 Kwak Ye-ji (born 1992), South Korean archer
 Kwak Min-jeong (born 1994), South Korean figure skater
 Gwak Been (born 1999), South Korean baseball pitcher
 Kwak Dae-sung, South Korean judo athlete

Film directors
 Kwak Young-jae (born 2000), South Korean film director
 Kwak Ji-kyoon (1954–2010), South Korean film director
 Kwak Jae-yong (born 1959), South Korean film director
 Kwak Kyung-taek (born 1966), South Korean film director

Entertainers
 Kwak Do-won (born 1974), South Korean actor
 Ji Sung (born Kwak Tae-geun, 1977), South Korean actor
 Kwak Hyun-hwa (born 1981), South Korean actress, comedian and singer
 Kwak Ji-min (born 1985), South Korean actress
Shin Hyun-been (born Kwak Hyun-been, 1986), South Korean actress
 Kwak Si-yang (born 1987), South Korean actor
 Kwak Hee-sung (born 1990), South Korean actor
 Kwak Dong-yeon (born 1997), South Korean actor and singer
 Kwak Jin-eon (born 1991), South Korean singer-songwriter
 Aaron Kwak (born 1993), South Korean singer, former member of boy band NU'EST

Other
 Gwak Jae-u (1552–1617), general under Seonjo of Joseon
 Chung Hwan Kwak (born 1936), Unification Church leader
 Kwak Pom-gi (born 1939), North Korean government official
 Kwak Jae-gu (born 1954), South Korean poet
 Kwak Yi-kyong (born 1979), South Korean LGBT rights activist
 Kwak Jaesik (born 1982), South Korean novelist
 Kwak Jun-hyeok, South Korean associate professor of political science at Korea University
 Kwak Kyung-sup, South Korean professor of electrical engineering at Inha University

References

Korean-language surnames